Mary Harriet "Mainie" Jellett (29 April 1897 – 16 February 1944) was an Irish painter whose Decoration (1923) was among the first abstract paintings shown in Ireland when it was exhibited at the Society of Dublin Painters Group Show in 1923. She was a strong promoter and defender of modern art in her country, and her artworks are present in museums in Ireland. Her work was also part of the painting event in the art competition at the 1928 Summer Olympics.

Early life
Jellett was born on 29 April 1897 at 36 Fitzwilliam Square, Dublin, one of the four daughters of William Morgan Jellett, a barrister and later MP, and Janet McKenzie Stokes. William and Eva were among the seven children of John Hewitt Jellett, Provost of Trinity College Dublin. Mainie's mother was an accomplished musician, and all her daughters received a musical education. Mainie's sister Dorothea (Bay) was the orchestra conductor at the Gaiety Theatre, Dublin. Her aunt was Eva Jellett, a pioneering doctor working in India.

Jellett's art education began at 11 when she received painting lessons from Elizabeth Yeats, Sarah Cecilia Harrison, and Mary Manning, who had a studio on Merrion Row, and whose influence on Irish Artists of the time was considerable.

She later studied at the Metropolitan School of Art in Dublin. Her teachers included William Orpen, and his influence is apparent in her work from this period. Despite her artistic talent, she was still undecided about her future, and at this time took regular piano lessons with the intent of becoming a concert pianist.

She decided to become a painter after working under Walter Sickert at the Westminster Technical Institute in London, where she enrolled in 1917 and remained until 1919. She showed precocious talent as an artist in the impressionist style. In 1920, she won the Taylor Art Scholarship worth £50. The same year, she submitted work to the annual exhibition of the Royal Hibernian Academy.

Career 
In 1921, along with her companion Evie Hone, she moved to Paris. There she worked under André Lhote and Albert Gleizes, encountering cubism and beginning an exploration of abstract art. Her new style, including colour and rhythm, was greatly inspired by her stay in France. After 1921, she and Evie Hone returned to Dublin, but for the next decade, they spent part of each year in Paris. In a 1943 essay entitled 'Definition of my Art' Jellett describes her art as having three revolutions inspired by her teachers; the first credited to Walter Sickert, the second to André Lhote, and the third to Albert Gleizes.

In 1923, she exhibited two cubist paintings at the Dublin Painters' Exhibition. The response was hostile, with the Irish Times publishing a photograph of one of the paintings and quoting their art critic as saying of them, 'to me they presented an insoluble puzzle'. The following year, she and Evie Hone had their first joint exhibition.

A deeply committed Christian, her paintings, though never strictly representational and sometimes completely non-objective, occasionally have religious titles and may, in some respects, resemble icons in tone and even, on occasion, in the palette. In Irish Art, a Concise History, Bruce Arnold writes: "Many of her abstracts are built up from a central 'eye' or 'heart' in arcs of colour, held up and together by the rhythm of line and shape, and given depth and intensity - a sense of abstract perspective - by the basic understanding of light and colour"

Jellett was an important figure in Irish art history, both as an early proponent of abstract art and as a champion of the modernist movement. Her painting was often attacked critically but she proved eloquent in defence of her ideas. Along with Evie Hone, Louis le Brocquy, Jack Hanlon, and Norah McGuinness, Jellett co-founded the Irish Exhibition of Living Art in 1944. In her published work "An Approach To Painting" (1942) Jellett stated why she felt artists were necessary for society:"The idea of an artist being a special person, an exotic flower set apart from other people is one of the errors resulting from the industrial revolution, and the fact of artists being pushed out of their lawful position in the life and society of the present day. … Their present enforced isolation from the majority is a very serious situation and I believe it is one of the many causes which has resulted in the present chaos we live in. The art of a nation is one of the ultimate facts by which its spiritual health is judged and appraised by posterity."

Death and legacy
Jellett died in Dublin on 16 February 1944, aged 46, of pancreatic cancer. Elizabeth Bowen wrote a heartfelt obituary published in the periodical The Bell in 1944. She mentions one of their last talks in which Jellett mentioned the work of a genius, Dorothy Richardson – until the end, showing solidarity with women and the feminist movement. 

A plaque commemorates her former residence and place of work on 24 Upper Pembroke Street, Dublin.

Her work was an important part of the Active Age project in the Irish Museum of Modern Art (IMMA), which was produced to rewrite the narrative of art and change the canon. Jellett's work was not very well known outside of Ireland, but she was a pioneer of a national avant-garde and strongly supported the encouragement of young Irish artists. The IMMA decided to evaluate and reexamine the European canon and bring artists like Mainie Jellett to the front line.

In 1990 Bruce Arnold produced, scripted, and narrated a documentary To Make it Live-Mainie Jellett. In 1991 Arnold published a comprehensive biography of Jellett together with an analysis of the modern movement in Ireland.

Work in collections
 Crawford Art Gallery, Cork, including:
 Composition (c. 1935)
 Niland Art Collection, Sligo
 Butler Gallery Collection, Kilkenny
 Trinity College, Dublin
 The Hugh Lane Municipal Gallery, Dublin
 The Irish Museum of Modern Art, Dublin
 Four Element Composition (1930)
 The National Gallery of Ireland, Dublin
 Greyfriars Municipal Art Gallery, Waterford Municipal Art Collection, Waterford
 Ulster Museum, Belfast, UK

References

Sources
 Claire Dalton (2014) "Irish Women Artists 1870 - 1970" Adams Summer Loan Exhibition 2014
Daire O'Connell (2002), Jellet, Mary Harriet (Mainie) in Brian Lalor (Ed.), The Encyclopedia of Ireland. Dublin: Gill & Macmillan. 
Bruce Arnold (1977), Irish Art, a Concise History (2nd Ed.), London: Thames and Hudson, 

Carson, Niall. Rebel by vocation: Seán O’Faoláin and the generation of The Bell. Manchester University Press, 2016. muse.jhu.edu/book/51370.

Dalton, Claire. Irish Women Artists 1870-1970: Summer Loan Exhibition. Dublin: Adams Auctioneers, 2014.
Dublin (Ireland). Municipal Gallery of Modern Art. Mainie Jellett, 1897-1944 : a retrospective exhibition of paintings and drawings. 1962-01-01T00:00:00Z. Retrieved from the Digital Public Library of America. Accessed 21 April 2020. http://www.archive.org/details/mainiejellett18900dubl.
Frost, Stella. A Tribute to Evie Hone and Mainie Jellett. Dublin: Browne and Nolan, 1957.

IMMA. Department of Culture, Heritage and the Gaeltacht. Accessed 22 April 2020. https://imma.ie/collection/?_sft_artwork_artist=mainie-jellett&sf_paged=1&obj=obj_24565.
Kennedy, S.B. A CelebrAtion of Irish Art And Modernism. Clandeboye: Adams, 2011. https://www.adams.ie/media/exhibition_pdfs/1456762848Modernscataloguesmall.pdf.
MacCarvill, Eileen, and Albert Gleizes. 1958. The artist's vision, Mainie Jellett: lectures and essays on art. Dundalk: Dundalgan Press.
"Mainie Jellett." Art UK. Arts Council England. Accessed 22 April 2020. https://www.artuk.org/discover/artists/jellett-mainie-18971944.

External links

Irish Arts Review article about the Irish Exhibition of Living Art
Short biography on the RTÉ website

1897 births
1944 deaths
20th-century Irish painters
20th-century Irish women artists
Alumni of the National College of Art and Design
Alumni of the Westminster School of Art
Burials at St. Fintan's Cemetery, Sutton
Irish women painters
Artists from Dublin (city)
Olympic competitors in art competitions
Deaths from pancreatic cancer
Deaths from cancer in Ireland